There have been three ships of the Royal Navy named HMS Redgauntlet after the novel by Sir Walter Scott:

 , a  launched in 1913, renamed  shortly after launch and scrapped in 1921.
 , an  launched in 1916 and scrapped in 1926.
 HMS Redgauntlet II, a paddle steamer requisitioned by the Admiralty in 1916 as a minesweeper and sold in 1919.

References

Royal Navy ship names